The Rucellai Sepulchre is a small funerary chapel built inside the Rucellai Chapel of the church of San Pancrazio, Florence. It was commissioned by Giovanni di Paolo Rucellai and built to designs by Leon Battista Alberti in imitation or emulation of the Holy Sepulchre in the Anastasis in Jerusalem. It contains the tombs of Giovanni Rucellai and members of his family.

Names 

History 

Leon Battista Alberti probably began work on the Rucellai Chapel and on the sepulchre within it in about 1458; the origins of the chapel date to 1417, when the walls of the nave of San Pancrazio were built. According to the inscription above the door, the Sepulchre was completed in 1467.

The Rucellai Chapel was closed for many years for restoration. Since 16 February 2013 it has been re-opened to the public. Access is through the Marino Marini Museum, which occupies the deconsecrated part of the church of San Pancrazio.

Description 

The inner walls and vault of the sepulchre are entirely frescoed, work that one author has attributed to Giovanni da Piamonte.

Inscriptions 

The sepulchre has two inscriptions: one, on a square panel above the door, reads:

meaning approximately "Giovanni di Paolo Rucellai, in order that his salvation might be prayed for from where, through Christ, the resurrection of all was achieved, had this temple built in the shape of the tomb in Jerusalem [in] 1467".

The other inscription runs round the top of the building and reads:

or approximately "you seek Jesus of Nazareth who was crucified; he rose, he is not here; this is the place where they put him".

Gallery: exterior

References 

Tombs in Italy
Monuments and memorials in Florence
Renaissance architecture in Florence
Chapels in Florence
Funerary art
Leon Battista Alberti buildings